Decarya is a monotypic genus of flowering plants belonging to the family Didiereaceae. It has one species Decarya madagascariensis Choux 

Its native range is Madagascar, and it was first described and published in Mém. Acad. Natl. Sci. Lyon, Cl. Sci. Vol.17 page 62 in 1934.

It was named after Raymond Decary (1891–1973), French botanist, ethnologist and colonial administrator who conducted research in Madagascar and collected for the National Museum of Natural History, France.

References

Didiereaceae
Caryophyllales genera
Endemic flora of Madagascar
Plants described in 1934